Fruškogorski maraton is a yearly hiking and ultra running marathon held on the last weekend of April or the first of May on Fruška gora, Serbia. It is one of the oldest marathons of this type in Europe.

History
The event was first held in 1978. These days it lasts for two days (Saturday/Sunday), with over 18,000 participants.

Since 2015 there are 19 marathon routes. The shortest is a 4.4-km long children's route, going longer with small, medium, long and ultra marathon, as well as the ultra extreme marathon that is 133,7 km long. The marathon routes are marked throughout the woods, and Fruška Gora Marathon trails are marked with a red heart on a white background.

Routes
The start and finish of the race is in Popovica, on the outskirts of the city of Novi Sad. The participants are divided into two categories: "sport" (competitive) and "fun" (non-competitive).

The trails of a competitive character are certified by the International Trail Running Association (ITRA) and are awarded a number of qualifying points for (Ultra-Trail du Mont-Blanc).

Available trail races with ITRA qualifying points:
 Ultra Extreme Marathon; 133.7 km; 5.700 D+; 6 UTMB points,
 Ultra Marathon; 107.8 km; 4.120 D+; 5 UTMB points,
 Great Eastern Marathon; 81.5 km; 3.190 D+; 4 UTMB points,
 Medium Eastern Marathon; 59.3 km; 2.150 D+; 3 UTMB points,
 Small Eastern Extreme Marathon; 41.9 km; 1.860 D+; 2 UTMB points

See also
Fruška Gora

References

External links
The official page
List of marathon routes

Ultramarathons
Marathons in Serbia
Athletics competitions in Serbia
Spring (season) events in Serbia